The following is a list of characters featured in the American stop motion animation series Moral Orel, created by Dino Stamatopoulos.

Most of the characters' names are references in some way to the stop motion animation process.

The Puppingtons

Orel Puppington
Orel Puppington is the protagonist of the series. He is an 11 (later 12) year-old boy whose quest is to be moral and good, which drives most of the plots of the episodes. He collects religious action figures and makes short animated movies with them. In his attempts to remain moral, he listens to Reverend Putty's sermons very closely. Even though he's very attentive and always means well, Orel tends to misinterpret the minister's teachings, leading to chaos for both him and the town.

The special "Beforel Orel" reveals that, even for a four-year-old, Orel was naive to a hazardous degree and didn't have the slightest understanding of God or hadn't been inducted into the towns corrupted version of Christianity and willingly believed anything that someone told him. Clay, in an attempt to forestall having to be an actual parent, sent Orel off to his grandfather, who taught Orel to think for himself and instilled in him and understanding of lies and truth and to not believe anything without "proof". When Orel was brought back to Moralton and innocently asked for proof of God, an emergency meeting of the church was called, during which Rev. Putty used the story of Abraham nearly sacrificing his son Issac to illustrate that, instead of asking for proof of God, that people should instead prove their belief in God. Ms. Censordoll later used the fear of Hell to reinforce this lesson. However, this led to Orel nearly sacrificing the newborn Shapey until his grandfather arrived and put a stop to it.

One aspect of the show is Orel's slow awakening to the flaws of the people around him as well as expanding his personal belief system beyond the rigid fundamentalist Christian doctrine of the town. In "Praying", Orel defies his father's orders and uses Buddhist meditation to deal with his stress. In "Charity", Orel became a full-fledged drug addict. While in "Orel's Movie Premiere", Orel (perhaps without realizing the implications) uses rather harsh portrayals of the people around him in his home movies, most notably portraying his father as a sadistic, drunken snarling wolf (which in turn led to Dr. Potterswheel asking Clay if he was molesting his son to make Orel see him as such a monster) while still referring to the appearance as a "loyal and good" puppy, still somewhat unaware of Clay's true character.

After the disastrous sequence of events in the two-part season two finale "Nature", Orel loses all respect for his father. When Clay shoots him in the leg in a drunken state, followed by drinking the disinfectant and subsequently denying fault for the incident, Orel not only tells his father for the first time that he hates him, but when asked if he shot a bear that had wandered into their camp whilst Clay was passed out, Orel lies and states that it was Clay who had shot it in order to deny him the joy of fatherly pride.  Later on, after "Hunting", Orel is seen still being polite and cheerful towards the townspeople, but becoming incredibly emotionally distant towards Clay: "Nesting" shows Orel being completely indifferent to Clay's threats of punishment in his study, completely in contrast to the audible gulp that took place in previous situations of the similar. As a result of the shooting (and likely Dr. Potterswheel's incompetent job in healing the leg), Orel gets a permanent limp, which Dino Stamotopolus said would have been kept throughout the series had it continued (and is indeed shown in the show's final scene of an adult Orel). Orel has yet to realize the flaws of the people in Moralton including his mother and his whole family (including his grandparents), though this is partly because Orel refuses to see anything but the good in people.

In the series finale, Orel realizes the exact nature of his father's relationship with Coach Stopframe, but the realization doesn't bother him much and a substantial bond between them develops. It's also shown that at the end, despite the apparent collapse of his family, Orel ultimately becomes a much better man than his father ever was, marrying his childhood sweetheart Christina Posabule and maintaining a loving, happy family with two kids and a puppy, unlike his still unhappy parents.

Orel is voiced by Carolyn Lawrence.

Clay Puppington
Clayton Middleinitial "Clay" Puppington is Orel's strict, abusive, alcoholic father and the main antagonist of the show, who tries to keep his home in line with a 1950s style of living. This masks the fact that Clay is an abusive alcoholic who hates his job as mayor of Moralton, his marriage, and his father.

As a child, Clay was the only surviving child of his parents, as his mother's drinking, smoking, and fun-loving lifestyle (including riding roller coasters, jumping on a trampoline, and horseback riding) caused her to miscarry ten of Clay's unborn siblings before he was born (largely because Clay's mother spent all of her pregnancy with Clay praying for his safety). Clay's mother was a religious zealot, who spoiled Clay rotten and instructed him in the various "lost commandments" of Moses. This created tension with Clay's father, who was outright neglected by his wife in favor of his son, to the point that he was forced to eat his son's leftovers. Clay's father did try to remain a part of his life and often warned Clay of his mother's heart condition. Clay unintentionally changed life forever when he faked his own death as a prank on his mother, causing her to have a fatal heart attack. Clay's father (who was not deeply religious) never forgave Clay for his part in his mother's death and emotionally shunned his son, ultimately telling him that he's "not even worth it" upon an initial refrain from slapping him. This deeply affected Clay, causing him to seek out his father's abuse as a means to gain any sort of emotional response and validation. The two formed a casual hatred towards each other and blaming each other for the death of Clay's mother. His love for his mother would develop into an Oedipus complex many years later, as shown in "Nesting". Clay's father gives his gun, Ol’ Gunny, to him saying he is ending the male Puppington tradition of passing along the gun to one's first born son, because it's tainted with blood and wanted nothing to do with it anymore. Not wanting to feel responsible for his mother's death, Clay says he'll keep the tradition going.
 
When Clay was in his early twenties, he was much similar to Orel, shown to be a rather mild figure who wanted to spend his days studying the Bible and drinking apple juice, showing he had a chance to have a happy life. While attending a wedding, Clay met Bloberta Hymentact. Bloberta asked about his family, Clay said "my parents are dead," not telling her the truth about his father being alive. The two went to the wedding reception together, where Bloberta introduced Clay to liquor. She believed that alcohol relaxed people for the better (mainly because that's what it had done to her father), and even used a religious justification ("Jesus drank") in order to get him to drink. Alcohol caused a massive switch in Clay's personality, turning him into a womanizer and drunken partier, before ultimately causing Bloberta to punch Clay unconscious in order to keep him from flirting with other women. Afterwards, Bloberta lied to Clay, telling him that he passed out and that she looked after him while he was unconscious. She then pressed him to marry her, citing that he needs someone like her to "help" him. Clay agreed, but by this point the damage was done as Clay was now a full-blown alcoholic who spent most of his wedding flirting with other women, getting drunk, and ultimately getting arrested after the wedding for driving under the influence.

Clay largely hates his family, not remembering his children's names or caring when one of his children (Shapey) is briefly switched with another child (Block). This is taken to an extreme in the episode "Numb" when he assumes Shapey and Block are a liquor-induced hallucination. He's rather misogynistic, believing that women differ from men in the ability to fulfill themselves solely through tending to their husbands. The show also reveals that Clay becomes sexually aroused when watching Bloberta do such chores, ultimately leading him to partake in voyeuristic swinger-style housekeeping. He's close friends with Coach Daniel Stopframe, who secretly lusts after Clay and the two constantly border on a homoerotic relationship. It has been shown that Stopframe is Clay's chief enabler as far as feeding his dependency on liquor and went as far as to seduce and impregnate Bloberta in order to be near him.    
Clay's actual sexuality has been a topic of debate and discussion amongst fans, with some speculating he is a closeted bisexual or homosexual. Throughout the show, he expresses a genuine distaste for woman, especially Bloberta. In Nature, he compares woman to his alcohol addiction, perhaps showing he feels forced to be attracted to them. Although he slept with female strippers in season 2, it should be noted this could be a result of societal conditioning and compulsive heterosexually. 

He will often bring Orel into his study to discuss various misdeeds Orel often does after dealing out "a good belting" to the boy. The lessons usually have little to do with the actual damage he caused, usually focusing on "the lesser of two evils". For example, when confronting Orel for raising the dead, Clay is more concerned with the fact that Orel created naked zombies (by removing their clothes prior to resurrecting them) than for actually creating zombies. Also, when Orel develops an unintentional addiction to crack cocaine, he's punished by Clay for speaking slang rather than smoking it. "Nesting" however, reveals that Orel has become completely indifferent to his father's threats.

He also has a collection of firearms in his study, including a Heckler & Koch PSG1 sniper rifle and what is revealed in "Nature Pt.1" to be an extensive arsenal. During a mostly unsuccessful camping trip with Orel, a drunk Clay rants violently about how awful his life is and then shoots Orel in the leg but denies any responsibility. He sinks even lower when, in "Honor," it's revealed that he continues to blame Orel for the injury, telling anyone who asked that it had happened because his son was either clumsy or had gotten in the way.

While Clay tries to maintain the facade that his life is perfectly happy, he is ultimately a pathetic, cruel, worthless, self-pitying, misogynistic, emotionally immature, and self-centered man who no longer cares for anyone but himself. However, to his credit, Clay is willing to raise two children who he knows are not his own, one of whom being the product of his wife's extramarital affair. He rants harshly about both life and relationships, and feels that he's never in control of his own life. He is ill-equipped to deal with life's problems and takes out his anger or frustration on his family, friends, and the town. Clay often complains about his "stinking dead-end job" and being "buried in paperwork". In the penultimate episode, it's revealed, even to Orel's surprise, that Clay is actually the Mayor of Moralton. On a document in his office his full name is shown to be Mayor Clayton Middleinitial Puppington.

In "Honor", Clay finally (though indirectly) admits his feelings for Coach Stopframe, in front of his wife and children. Stopframe, however, coldly refuses him, saying it's "too late" and Clay leaves dejected and defeated. A picture of him and Bloberta both frowning is seen on the wall in Orel's home in the final scene suggesting that they are still unhappy together, a stark contrast to Orel and Christina.

In "Beforel Orel", Clay was shown to have little confidence to talk to Orel about anything and tried avoided talking to him at all times. He hated the idea of Bloberta being pregnant with Shapey (not knowing he wasn't his). Through most of the time, he's seen whining about having another child to take care of. Near the end, he talks for the first time with his father, Arthur. During their talk, it is seen how Arthur's rejection has affected Clay and for a moment Arthur may show regret. The moment is gone quick, as Clay refuses to reconcile with his father and forbids him from seeing Orel. It's hinted Clay may actually miss his father, as he looked regretful when Arthur left.

He is voiced by Scott Adsit.

Bloberta Puppington (née Hymentact)
Bloberta Puppington (née Hymentact) is Orel and Shapey's mother. The forgotten and shunned middle child of a family choir (forbidden from participating due to her mother's blatant favoritism for both her older sister and her younger brother), she was her mother's least favorite child due to her terrible voice. Out of both desperation and loneliness, Bloberta manipulated Clay Puppington into marrying her after only knowing him for a day, largely as a means to escape her family and to be accepted alongside her friends who were also engaged. She is a strict, stereotypical housewife known for her obsessive-compulsive cleanliness (she is shown scrubbing the very cleaning products she uses, the underside of the kitchen floor tiles, and even sweeping the lawn). It's revealed that during the couple's first date, Bloberta introduced Clay to liquor, assuming that drinking would make him a better person and reasoning with Clay that "Jesus drank". However, she becomes disgusted by Clay's drunken boorishness, and turns to obsessive cleaning as her new crutch to cope (only to marry him shortly afterward, regardless).

"Beforel Orel" shows she's not too different from her present-self and cared little that Orel almost walked in on her, while she was cheating on Clay with Coach Stopframe. It's also shown that when she went into labor, Bloberta had to perform the entire procedure herself as Dr. Potterswheel had left the room when Orel had started asking Clay questions about reproduction.

Bloberta and Clay have a dysfunctional relationship, with Bloberta often shown to be emotionally abusive towards Clay, taunting him over his drunkenness and failures as an adult. She also withholds sex from her husband, going as far as to force her husband to sleep in a separate bed next to her own, with a partition titled 'Lust Guard' placed between them. In the Christmas episode, she and Clay argue over Shapey's alleged paternity, causing Clay to accuse her of infidelity and storm out. When Orel attempts to reunite the family for Christmas, Bloberta coldly tells Orel to spend it with Clay himself, taking Shapey and leaving Orel in town. Later, to avoid embarrassment for their incompetence as parents, the two reunite out of concerns what will the people of Moralton think if they separate.

The episode "Numb" revealed that Bloberta hasn't had a proper orgasm in years, and has mutilated her genitalia from using various power drills for masturbation. She tries to find a sex partner, but is turned down by various men. When asked by Orel why she married Clay, she simply responds "Why not?" mimicking her wedding vows instead of giving an actual reason.
During the first season she seems to dote on her second son Shapey, who was the result of an extramarital affair Bloberta had with Orel's bisexual gym teacher Coach Stopframe. Bloberta spoiled Shapey, though this was largely a means to silence his constant temper tantrums. However, when Clay found out the truth about Shapey, Bloberta began to turn her illegitimate son away; this ultimately led to Shapey being accidentally switched with another child, and Bloberta failing to notice for several months.

She shows little love to Orel, not even getting upset when Orel is shot and never confronts Clay about the incident. She is shown in "Honor" to get excited and happy under the impression that her family is going out caroling together, only to be disappointed when she realizes that it is a scheme of Clay's to see Stopframe (showing her desire for a truly happy family). She is last shown in a photograph frowning with Clay at the end of "Honor", implying that they are still unhappily married.

She is voiced by Britta Phillips.

Shapey Puppington and Block Posabule
Shapey Puppington is Orel's half-brother and biological son of Coach Daniel Stopframe. Shapey is a seven-year-old boy with the mentality of a three-year-old: he acts out, throws tantrums when not getting his way, shouts, and rarely speaks any complete sentences, usually communicating in one or two word screams ("Drink!", "Mine!", "Cake!", "Shut up!"). He was even still breastfed by his mother at the age of seven, although he is weaned later in the show. His parents, Clay and Bloberta, spoil him rotten in order to stop him from screaming and to prove that they are good parents (although judging from Shapey's behavior, they seem to be unknowingly and ironically proving the opposite). Orel often tries to discipline his brother and stop him from doing dangerous things, only to be scolded by his parents for upsetting the younger boy. Running gags in the show would feature Shapey playing with various dangerous items (such as putting a BB-gun to his eye or hardware tools in his mouth) and constantly asking his mother to breastfeed him.

In the Season Two episode "The Lord's Prayer" he was accidentally replaced by Block Posabule (born January 3, 1999), the son of the Puppington's new neighbors, The Posabules. Clay seemed to notice the difference, but he shrugged it off and has shown no further interest in the matter due to his selfishness, and belief that the "double child" is an alcohol-induced hallucination. Clay seems to eventually realize it though, at one point referring to "two illegitimates". No one else in either family noticed, apart from Orel and Block's sister Christina—despite the Posabules moving away, taking Shapey with them, inadvertently leaving Block in his place, at the end of the episode. However, in several later episodes such as Repression, Orel bluntly tries to tell his father "That's not Shapey," but is ignored. The main difference between the two is their hair color (Block is a redhead, while Shapey is blond) and head shape (Shapey's head is round while Block's is more thin); their behaviors are much the same (although Block is often in a happier mood and rarely does he scream). In the episode "Numb", Bloberta finally figures it out after going through a family album. When she goes to the Posabules' house to retrieve him, Mrs. Posabule gives back Shapey and abandons Block after he shows love for Bloberta, forcing her to adopt Block. The two bond to one another instantly. At the end of the episode "Sacrifice", Shapey speaks calmly for the first time, telling Bloberta, "Mommy, when I'm thirsty, it feels how I feel when I'm alone."

In "Honor" they are both shown as having calmed down significantly, with pictures of them in the final scene showing Shapey becoming a police officer, and Block becoming a firefighter.

They are both voiced by Tigger Stamatopoulos, the daughter of show creator and executive producer Dino Stamatopoulos.

Angela Puppington
Angela Puppington was Clay's mother, and utterly devoted to her son. She held him well above her husband Arthur, to the point of serving Arthur Clay's leftovers from his dinner plate. She had ten pregnancies before Clay (Clark, Clarissa, Clementine, Clara, Clarice, Clea, Clancy, Clarence, Clinton, and Clondike), but lost them all from her smoking, drinking, and participation in high impact activities during pregnancy (apparently not realizing these were what led to the miscarriages).  During Clay's pregnancy, she devoted all her time to prayer, forgetting such other things.  She considers Clay her miracle child, and is a devout fundamentalist to the point of believing that "there are no accidents, only evil and miracles." Clay's mother was a religious zealot, who spoiled Clay rotten and instructed him in the various, fabricated "lost commandments" of Moses. The word "dead", or words that contain that sound ("loaded", "ended"), startle and upset her after having to face the deaths of so many unborn children; she is quick to admonish her husband ("don't you say that word!") if he dares to utter any word with a similar sound, even if it only has the "-ded" suffix.

She has a weak heart, and when Clay fakes his death as a prank, she breaks down, asking God to take her instead. When Arthur reveals that Clay is still alive, she believes it to be a miracle. The shock proves too much for her heart, and she dies of a heart attack. Clay, when drinking, is seen to reflect on the events of that night. He uses his mother's "lost commandments" to teach Orel when he does something wrong, and has them mounted on plaques around the walls of his study. Her death is shown to have affected Clay deeply, and his love for his mother has subsequently crystallized into an Oedipus Complex.

Arthur Puppington
Arthur Puppington was Clay's father.  He once had a great relationship with his wife Angela, but she became obsessed with her "miracle child" Clay when he was born, neglecting Arthur.  He begrudgingly deals with it, pining for the times they had before Clay's birth.  He attempts to pass "Ol' Gunny" on to his son, but Clay proves too afraid to hold the revolver. He is not deeply religious and more sane than anyone else in his family.

When Clay plays his prank, Arthur notices the half-empty bottle of ketchup and realizes that Clay is merely faking, shaking Clay until he stops.  When Angela dies, Arthur becomes openly bitter towards Clay.  He often refers to Clay's "murder" of his mother, and passes Ol' Gunny to him not as part of the tradition, but because it is "tainted" with Angela's blood. Both Arthur and Clay hate each other because of Angela's death.  His previous disregard of Angela's fundamental views seems to have developed into full atheism (as he said to the men bringing his wife's dead body to the hospital truck that there was no heaven and was the only one not praying during Angela's funeral).

Soon after Angela's death, Arthur prepares to smack Clay when the boy tells him he'll go to hell for saying there was no heaven, but holds back, claiming Clay to be "not even worth it".  From then on, Clay begins thinking of corporal punishment as a show of love, a show that he is worth it, and takes every opportunity to earn it. His father gives his gun to Clay saying he is ending the male Puppington tradition because it is tainted with blood and wanted nothing to do with it anymore. Not wanting to feel responsible for his mother's death, Clay says he'll keep the tradition going only to fail terribly with Orel during the hunting trip.

Years later when Clay is an adult, Bloberta ask about his family, Clay said "my parents are dead", not telling her the truth about Arthur being alive all these years.

Also, one episode Orel got birthday money from his grandfather (Arthur), irritating Clay.

"Beforel Orel" reveals that Arthur lives on a farm far in Sinville and has disdain of the town and its beliefs. It is on this farm that Arthur attempts to impart some of his own knowledge to Orel and the two bond very quickly. His beliefs seem to change from atheism to slightly indifferent about God, though there's no real reason why the change. There are a few possibilities as to why he was now indifferent, he didn't want to push his beliefs on Orel; Orel being innocent and not knowing of God didn't annoy him so much since Clay and Angela were religious zealots; or simply he wished to keep his beliefs or lack thereof to himself. As he did try avoiding talking about God to Orel. Arthur does begin to bond with his grandson and acts more of a parent to him than Bloberta or Clay. Orel still trusts his grandfather above everyone else, despite Clay's efforts to make him hate his grandfather.

Throughout the series Clay fails to make peace with his father, and his father never forgives Clay about Angela's death. In "Beforel Orel", there was a moment when Arthur saw how he had affected Clay with his rejection. And for a moment may have felt concern or regret, but it goes quickly.

According to Scott Adsit, had the series continued beyond the third season, Arthur Puppington would have become a regular member of the show's cast, returning to live with Clay after learning that he was dying from a terminal illness. Arthur would be the only parent figure to Orel. Bloberta would not be pleased about Clay's lie about his father being dead. Clay would have proven Arthur right about Clay being ultimately a pathetic, oafish, self-centered man who has no love for anyone other than himself. Orel and Arthur would've started to get along with each other.

Mrs. Hymentact
Mrs. Hymentact is Bloberta's mother, and the domineering matriarch of the Hymentact family.  She leads the rest of the family, with the exception of Bloberta, in a family choir. Mrs. Hymentact blatantly favors her oldest daughter and youngest son over middle child Bloberta, going so far as to ban Bloberta from singing in the family choir in favor of her older sister, saying "You know we don't need two sopranos." She keeps everyone in line and reacts to the slightest misstep with loud screaming, having completely crushed the spirit of her husband Raymond in this way. Bloberta and her father fail to stand up against Mrs. Hymentact, instead seeming to have resigned themselves to lives thwarted and dominated by her.

Years later, Bloberta mirrors her mother's habits by showing favoritism towards Shapey. Another habit is bossing Clay around. Bloberta denies this. In "Honor" Bloberta shows that she tries to be better than her mother by wanting to have Orel in the family choir.

Bloberta may have realized that she did her mother a favor by leaving the Hymentact family. Mrs. Hymentact may be glad that Bloberta is gone. Throughout the series, Bloberta failed to stand up to her mother.

She is Orel's grandmother, but it is not shown that the two of them have ever met.

Raymond Hymentact
Raymond Hymentact is Bloberta's father. He constantly shakes and is never seen without a drink in hand.  His domineering wife has crushed his spirit, and he is completely afraid of her, reacting at even a glare with "I'll shut up!"  He deeply cares for Bloberta, and sneaks to her room to console her when she feels left out, although he is jittery the whole time, worrying that his wife will catch him (implying as to how much Mrs. Hymentact doesn't like Bloberta). Despite his obvious fear and shortcomings, Bloberta believes that her father's drinking helps to make him a better person and seeks to set that same standard for Clay. However, her plan backfired badly. Bloberta may or may not realize that drinking is the real reason why her father, Clay, herself, and most of the town are weak people. One thing Raymond is right about (that his wife will never agree with) is that nobody is "perfect".

Raymond is Orel's grandfather, although the two appear never to have met.

Modella Hymentact
Modella Hymentact is Bloberta's older sister. She is the sole soprano in the family choir.  One of Mrs. Hymentact's favorite children.  Although she is Orel's aunt, the show contains no suggestion that the two have ever met.

Modella has the same birthday as Mr. and Mrs. Christein's son, Junior.

She is voiced by Jeanette Baity.

Lunchbox Hymentact
Lunchbox Hymentact is Bloberta's red-headed, freckled little brother, who is a part of the family choir. He is also rude, a little self-confident, and obnoxious. His mother hits him in the head in order for him to be quiet. It is possible that "Lunchbox" is a nickname or genital-related euphemism; when Bloberta enters the room and begins to sing along, off-key, with the rest of the family, Mrs. Hymentact first asks Modella if it was she who sang out of tune. Modella denies this, to which Bloberta's mother replies "Well, it certainly wasn't our little Lunchbox here!", suggesting that Bloberta's brother has progressed far enough in the stages of puberty to be unable to sing in so high a register.

According to Dino Stamatopoulos' Twitter page, Lunchbox was named after a stop-motion device which allowed for them to see the previous and next shot with the push of a button.

It is possible that Mrs. Hymentact had an affair with someone else who is Lunchbox's father, just like Bloberta had her affair with Coach Stopframe, who is Shapey's father.

Lunchbox would be Orel's uncle, but it is not suggested that he and Orel have ever met.

Church

Reverend Rod Putty
Rod Putty is the minister for the local church of Moralton and wears a very obvious brown toupee. He is a very lonely and bitter individual who is held in both high esteem and disdain by the citizens (case in point: his house is egged on Halloween). His disdain for God often finds its way into his sermons, and he has a coffee cup in his office stating "I hate my boss," though sometimes it says "...and then you die," and read "...Jesus and the ass you rode in on" in "Innocence." His resentment stems from being a prematurely balding virgin. Putty has also displayed some racist tendencies, such as leading the segregation of the Figurellis and showing no interest in dating non-white women. The episode "Elemental Orel" implies that he was planning to use the money from the church collection plate to hire a prostitute. Eventually, he is approached for a lunch date by Stephanie, Moralton's resident punk-rocking piercing shop proprietor. Thinking he is about to get lucky, he is soon devastated to learn that she is his daughter. In 1975, Stephanie's mother, a woman named Gladys Foamwire stole Reverend Putty's tissue paper that was covered with his semen, and used that semen to impregnate herself. Later, she gave birth to Stephanie. Putty is slightly more rational than the rest of the townspeople, though of course, this is only relative to the blind fanaticism of most Moralton residents. As the seasons have gone on, his character has evolved to a more laid-back and more accepting person, to the point he is accepting of his daughter's lesbianism and has even been imparting fatherly advice and joking around with her. This reaches a further level when he admits to Stephanie that her high school "relationship" with Doughy's mother, Kim, was unfair to her. Unsurprisingly, he is the only one who notices that while Orel is a good person, and means well, the faulty advice he and the other adults of the town give him always leads to him taking it to a high extremes, creating havoc in the town. In the episode "Sacrifice" Clay tries to goad him, Officer Papermouth and Dr. Potterswheel into a fight but the three of them leave in disgust instead. He is voiced by William Salyers.

School

Principal Norm Fakey
Norm Fakey is the principal of Alfred G. Diorama Elementary. While he attempts to run the school according to his community's strict moral code, he himself has been having an affair with Nurse Bendy for some time. His wife is completely unaware of this, and Fakey felt extreme guilt over his deception until receiving advice from Orel in "Repression". He is now in denial concerning the affair, and has thrown his wife out of the house, blaming the gonorrhea he received from Nurse Bendy on his wife's (nonexistent) infidelity. Later in the series, Joe insults him over his affair. His last name "Fakey" is a reference to the fact that he is essentially a fake or false husband, due to his affairs. It could also reference the fake love for his wife or their fake marriage. He was originally voiced by Jay Johnston, but was also voiced by David Herman in some season three episodes.

Miss Agnes Sculptham
Agnes Sculptham is Orel's school teacher. Bored and uninterested, she leads Orel's class through half-hearted field trips and lectures. Most of the information she imparts is heavily slanted in religion and absent in basic facts. She often does the bare minimum required from her though in "Courtship", she mercilessly manipulates students smitten by her into  giving her expensive gifts. It is revealed in "Alone" that she was raped by Mr. Creepler and impregnated by him, and gave herself an abortion (as heavily implied by the bloody coat hanger she fixes), but she still shows borderline obsession over him as she had her first orgasm because of him. It also seems to imply that she wanted to be raped, as she dyed her hair black because Creepler did not like blondes, which was her natural color; also going so far as leaving her apartment unlocked to allow him easy access. She also has obsessive compulsive disorder, as evidenced by her need to turn the light switch on and off and engage and disengage her deadbolt lock many times in quick succession. The moments of obvious pains she shows in "Alone" indicate her self-done abortion may have severely damaged her internal organs. Her last name is a play on the words "sculpt" and "them." As a teacher, she is responsible for sculpting the children into something acceptable in the eyes in Moralton society. According to the show's creators, had the show continued past cancellation, they would have shown that her abortion failed, and had her give birth to a girl. She is voiced by Britta Phillips.

Coach Daniel Stopframe
Daniel "Danielle" Stopframe is Orel's gym teacher. He is a blond, mustachioed, soft-spoken, effeminate, and rather self-absorbed bisexual man who is obsessed with Orel's father, Clay. His obsession led to the Coach having a brief affair with Orel's mother, Bloberta, whom he impregnated with her second child, Shapey.

Unlike the rest of the town's residents, Coach Stopframe is portrayed as a rather nihilistic figure within the community. He has been shown to be willing to pray to both God and Satan in order to get what he wants, including engaging in Satanic rituals in an attempt to make the track team run faster. Indeed, he often keeps his personal crucifix on his wall tilted on its side, to demonstrate his flexibility regarding his religious beliefs.

As a bisexual, Stopframe is shown to be indiscriminate in his sexual practices. Besides sleeping with Bloberta Puppington (whom he later rejected when she tried to resume their affair) and openly lusting after Clay Puppington (whose alcoholism Stopframe encourages), the Coach is once seen with three women and a dog. Stopframe is a fan of gothic erotica.

In "Honor", Daniel becomes increasingly disillusioned with Clay after watching Clay make out with Ms. Censordoll.  Daniel shows himself to actually be a very competent parent figure to Orel, including buying him hot chocolate, teaching him to ice-skate without his crutch, and even decorating a Christmas tree. In an insightful moment, Daniel tells a despondent Orel that if Clay has anything worth honoring, it is the fact that he created Orel. Near the end, when Clay (through Orel) finally admits his feelings for Daniel, Daniel coldly refuses him, having finally realized how shallow and pathetic Clay is.

He was originally voiced by Jay Johnston but was voiced by Scott Adsit in season three.

Doughy Latchkey
Doughy Latchkey (born February 14, 1994) is Orel's best friend. He is very God-fearing and always tries to look out for Orel though he usually just follows Orel's lead. He's also somewhat more reasonable of the two, as he usually tries to talk Orel out of his weird ideas. He is also naive and very fearful; as a result, he is often indecisive and consistently fails to stand up for himself when pressed (such as letting Orel and Joe throw rocks at his dad's car). In "Courtship," Doughy's home life was revealed: his parents had Doughy when they were very young, and as such, still act like teenagers. His last name, "Latchkey", is a reference to the severe neglect Doughy suffers from his parents, who, while being very affectionate toward each other, usually pay Doughy cash to get out of their hair, lock him outside the house and hide the key so they can have sex without their son around. "Courtship" also reveals that Mr. Creepler, the ice-cream man, has a crush on him; a situation that he plays to his advantage, getting Creepler to finance gifts for his own crush; his teacher, Miss Sculptham. He has never been seen without his beanie and has rapid mood swings from despondent to cheerful. In "Trigger", it was revealed that he has a gift for marksmanship, evidently stemming from his belief that he and his actions don't matter.  Doughy's final appearance in the series revealed a growth spurt as he appeared more mature and is shown to becoming more aware of townspeople's poor behavior in "Abstinence", stating how much niceness is considered bad by moralton's standards. Doughy also has the strange gift of smelling love making from a mile away.

"Beforel Orel" reveals that he and Orel met when they were both four and that he (reluctantly) joined two other boys (Tommy and Kid One) in taking advantage of Orel's extreme naivete and making him perform dangerous actions such as climbing high on an electrical tower (conveniently located in a children's park) and then walking off it or wearing multiple layers of coats despite the sweltering heat.

He is voiced by Scott Adsit.

Joe Secondopinionson/Bendy
Joe Secondopinionson-Bendy  is introduced as Coach Stopframe's nephew in "Loyalty", Orel was asked to be Joe's "Bible buddy". Orel is too blind to see through Joe, because Clay never teaches Orel right from wrong and never shows him how to see through people. He is a hellion and sociopath, frequently committing petty acts of vandalism, theft, and, most often, bullying. He is also a homophobic, as he is very uncomfortable around homosexuals and spent most of his first appearance beating two gay boys with a baseball bat. He insults everyone in Moralton right in front of them. The reason he keeps getting away with it because the town is too incompetent to do anything about it just like when they are unable to handle Orel's problems. The town way of saying, "He's not my kid. Not my problem."

"Dumb" gives at least a small indication that his violent tendencies may stem from his home life. His father is advanced in age and is implied to have Alzheimer's. This apparently leaves Joe afraid of both old age and getting old. He also has a sister, who has an oddly deep, masculine voice, and is largely apathetic to what Joe does. She's completely unfazed when Joe severely beats up their father after learning that his mother, who supposedly died during childbirth, is still alive. His search for her ultimately leads him to Nurse Bendy, who is probably his birth mother. They're last seen skating together in "Honor", happily accepting their new lives as mother and son.

Despite his lack of interest in the town's oppressive Protestant religion, he has been known to mock other children over "religious retardation" and appears to be one of the few—if only—people in Moralton to be aware of, or willing to recognize, the rampant hypocrisy of the towns people, as hinted in "Orel's Movie Premiere" where he verbally mocks the gathered adults.

He is voiced by Jay Johnston.

Tommy Littler
Thomas 'Tommy' Littler is Orel's former classmate and friend who had difficulty accepting the unquestioning religious teaching that the school provided. Because he attempted to provide scientific rather than religious answers on his schoolwork, he was labeled as "retarded" by the school and placed in the "Special Education" class, where all such "religiously retarded" students are "taught" at a pre-school level by a teacher who frequently leaves the class unsupervised for extended periods. Tommy and the students use this time to read science and philosophy books. Orel was assigned as Tommy's "Brain Buddy," to help him get to and from school and assist him with basic learning; help that Tommy does not actually need. While he seems somewhat irritated by this treatment, Tommy doesn't begrudge Orel, saying "at least his heart's in the right place." He is voiced by Britta Phillips.

Marionetta
Marionetta is a girl in Orel's classroom. She has blonde hair, wears a red sweater and a white skirt with colorful poka-dots on it. In "Elemental Orel", she solves the mystery of the donation money for church that was stolen by Joe. Marionetta has an unnamed father and baby sister.

Kid One
Kid One, Unnamed child, the Other Guy or Billy is one of Orel's collective friends. He has red hair with freckles on his face. His name was never revealed in the series. In the series' special "Beforel Orel" he tries to say his name, but is interrupted by Orel. He has a father who only appeared in the episode "Trigger".

Mr. Armature
Dale Armature is the temporary music and drama teacher at the school. He is formerly the stand-up bass player for the folk trio "The Crucifolks", Dale became a drama teacher after his married bandmates (Lily and Leaf) essentially fired Dale by way of disbanding "Crucifolk" in order to continue on as a duo.  Six months later and sporting a beard, he has turned his efforts to Broadway theater with offerings like "Crooning Jesus," but they are ignored. Very nervous and excitable, his most noticeable feature is that he has only one eyebrow (because he plucks out his eyebrows when he is nervous or irritated) and has an unrequited crush on Lily. He is voiced by Dino Stamatopoulos.

Nurse Nursula Bendy
Nursula Bendy is a nurse at St. Martin Luther's Protestant Hospital, and is also the school nurse at Alfred G Diorama Elementary School. Though apparently a registered nurse, she is very inattentive and lacks even rudimentary medical knowledge, exemplified in the episode "Grounded" when, after an unconscious Orel opens his eyes, she says, "At least his eyes are alive." She also seems generally dimwitted or at least uninterested, prompting the doctors to frequently order her to "sit outside and look pretty," though this may just be an example of Moralton's rampant misogyny. In "Alone," she is revealed to possibly be suffering from paranoid delusions. Despite being an adult, she regresses to a childlike state at home.  She plays house with her teddy bears, named Hubby and Sonny, and calls them her "family," acting out her fantasy of being a loving mother in a stable relationship.  She does this because she suffers from incredible loneliness and isolation. She is afraid that people only care about her for "dirty, awful things," and wants someone who recognizes that she is "a real person" and feels sad and afraid in addition to "happy thoughts". She has a psychotic breakdown when she knocks her "hubby" onto herself while cleaning up some mustard. She begins screaming, believing that he too is attempting to have sex with her. He then falls over, knocking some milk onto her, vaguely resembling semen. Her story in "Alone" ends with her sobbing uncontrollably in a corner, believing now that even he only wants her for sex.

She is having an affair with Principal Fakey, though she seems completely uninterested in him and expresses no pleasure—or even acknowledgment—when they have sex. She has gonorrhea.

In "Dumb", it is implied that the school bully, Joe Secondopinionson, is her son, whom she was forced to give up at birth. After an uncharacteristically touching sequence where she and Joe bond, she throws her stuffed teddy bear "Sonny" in the trash, no longer needing the childish fantasy substitute now that she has a real son. In the final episode, she and Joe are seen happily ice-skating together.
She is voiced by Britta Phillips.

Walt Gluegun
Walt Gluegun is the school bully who torments the other kids, even Orel and Doughy. Orel thought he could make friends with Walt after hearing the song "Turn The Other Cheek" by Presbo the Clown. Walt responded by giving Orel a few punches. Orel's clothes were smudged with his blood and his mother always washed them. Later, Orel's father lectured him about how to fight. When Walt was about to pound Doughy, Orel punched Walt hard in the face and he fell to the floor, followed by a kick in the face as he continued to sing "Turn The Other Cheek" revealing him to be surprisingly strong. As with most (i.e. all) advice given to him, Orel took things too far and brutally assaulted not only other kids when they appeared to make a 'fist' through an innocent action, but even his own father.

Miss Secondopinionson
Ms. Secondopinionson is the school receptionist and is Joe's half-sister. When she speaks on the phone to take phone calls, she holds her nose and makes a stereotypical voice of a woman, but she really has a masculine voice. At home, she takes care of Joe and her aging father, Dr. Secondopinionson, who has alzheimers. She seems to be depressed all the time, and she's barren. Joe is always abusive towards her and their father. He says "you're not my mom!" to her as an excuse to treat her poorly, she responds "I'm nobody's mom." He asks her why she isn't married, she answers she "isn't able" to have children. Joe answers that maybe it’s because she has an "ugly" (her manly) voice. It is revealed that she's always known who Joe's real mother is, who is revealed to be Nurse Bendy. After Joe meets his mother, he returns home to attack his father for not telling him about her. He couldn't remember anything about her, and he claims that "she died from childbirth". Ms. Secondopinionson tells Joe that their father is getting older and he's losing his mind from Alzheimer's. When Joe visits the hospital again to see his mother, he asks why she threw her teddy bear, named "Sonny", in the trashcan outside her apartment. She answers that "Sonny" didn't work anymore and the teddy bear was a representation of him. They form a successful relationship. In "Honor" they are seen happily ice-skating together. It is unknown what comes over Ms. Secondopinionson when Joe leaves to live with his mother, and the series had ended. She most likely still took care of their aging father until his death.

Dolores Stoopdown
Dolores Stoopdown is the special education teacher. Her first appearance was in the episode "God's Blunders". She leaves the classroom unsupervised for a number of periods of time, leaving Tommy and the other "religiously retarded" children to learn real things with real important books. In "Help", it is revealed that she was engaged at the age of 18, but she doesn't have a husband anymore. It is possible that they'd got divorced, and it's revealed that she lives in Aloneford Apartments.

Other townspeople

Ms. Censordoll
Francis Clara Censordoll  is the town librarian, employed at the Thomas Bowdler Library, and arguably the primary antagonist of the series.  She is a puritanical individual who spends her time censoring and destroying books she considers immoral (i.e., nearly all of them). The initials of her full name are FCC, a reference to the Federal Communications Commission. She also fights very hard to keep children away from "filthy thoughts," whether it is tracking kids who are reading about Renaissance art or leading protests against the offending individual.  She frequently leads protests in front of the local movie theater, even protesting such movies as The Ten Commandments and The Wizard of Oz. Despite her elderly appearance, she is, in truth, only 40 years old. In "Help," it is revealed her hair was originally black, and that Bloberta was part of her protest group and Bloberta tried to be as clever as her, but to no avail. Censordoll makes terrible mistakes about people like Fakey's wife would last forever, but ending horribly because of Fakey's affair and throwing her out. Her own indulgences got her in trouble in "Offensiveness," when natural birth eggs, her favorite food, became outlawed and she was forced to find black market substitutes for her craving, thus falling into hypocrisy. She, herself however has been shown to violate her own code of ethics if it means getting what she wants. For example, in both "Nesting" and "Alone" despite her strong aversion to nudity and premarital sex, she uses her body to get the eggs she craves. It is revealed in "Alone" that Censordoll's obsession with chicken eggs is due to that she does not possess human eggs herself:  when she was an infant her mother had surgery performed on her that removed her reproductive system (it is not clear whether this was for a legitimate medical reason, or some sort of religious motivation). This may explain why she aged so badly. As such, she considers herself to be immaculate and has a messianic complex regarding her importance within Moralton (this was shown in the opening sequence of "Nesting," as Censordoll's hand was shown moving the clouds away in God's place). In "Nesting," Censordoll embarked upon a scheme to seduce Clay Puppington to win against him as the next mayor, offering to be his mistress, using the fact that she was unable to produce children and manipulating his Oedipal feelings towards his dead mother, to convince Clay of her potential as his mistress. She was voiced by Jay Johnston in the first two seasons, and by Scott Adsit in the third season. Her final appearance is in the last episode, "Honor".

"Beforel Orel" shows her being brought in to instill a fear of Hell into a four-year-old Orel, to keep him in line.

Doctor Potterswheel
Quentin Xavier Potterswheel is an elderly doctor in charge of the local hospital. A staunch Protestant, he is very quick to declare various diseases as "God's Will" and hides his incompetence by withholding medical treatment to patients, causing them to die or suffer unnecessarily. Clay implies that this led to the death of his own wife, as he allegedly refused to treat an infection his wife had, opting to give her painkillers instead. Indeed, Potterswheel often hides behind his religion to shirk responsibility whenever a patient of his dies (he even considers taking responsibility for the patient's death as a sign of egotism). He does have basic medical knowledge but often forsakes it for blind faith. His morals are questionable, he has a nurse who has no medical qualifications or interest in her own job, has been seen disposing used needles in an unsafe manner and once accepted blood from a clearly drug-crazed and under-aged Orel.

He is sexually aroused by physical pain and injury, especially in regards to female patients of his, as shown in "Numb" when he displays a sexual interest in Bloberta Puppington when she injures herself by using a jackhammer as a dildo. After she heals and gets rid of the jackhammer, however,  he loses all interest and refuses to even look at her. This fetish is likely his reason for becoming a doctor, despite his ineptitude. In the episode "Sacrifice" Clay tries to goad him, Officer Papermouth, and Reverend Putty into hitting him but the three of them leave in disgust instead. He is voiced by Scott Adsit.

Dr. Secondopinionson
Dr. Secondopinionson was the retired doctor of St. Martin Luther's Protestant Hospital, and was Joe and Ms. Secondopinionson's father. He suffered from Alzheimer's and eventually stopped working as a doctor. His adult daughter, Ms. Secondopinionson, takes care of him. He was a minor character in some episodes, but in "Dumb", he played a major role. It is revealed that he once had a relationship with Joe's biological mother, Nurse Bendy. He forced her to give up Joe when he was born so he could raise him instead. When Joe finally realizes this, he comes home to confront his father about him not knowing about his real mother, but he couldn't remember because of his Alzheimer's, claiming that she died during childbirth.

Mr. Figurelli
Sal Figurelli is an Italian man of modest means. His character is defined by his perpetually chipper and sunny attitude that never falters even in the most trying of circumstances (like being pummeled by a drug-crazed Orel or having his house fire-bombed). He has held a variety of jobs. At times he is running a grocery store; in another episode, he runs a cat grooming business and in Holy Visage he drives a bus. At his store he sells a variety of goods, from eggs to placate Censordoll to "hard milk" and various wares geared towards exploitation of private concerns. He is not above exploitative labor practices, child labor for example (as seen in "Charity" when he hires Orel as his delivery boy for twenty-five cents an hour plus whatever he makes in tips), and his home life as portrayed in "Maturity" is very unstable. Later in the series, he engages with prostitutes.

In "God's Image," due to Orel taking the Reverend's sermon of God making people in his own image too literally, the Figurellis become the subjects of a very odd form of racism. The town becomes segregated between the Figurellis and everyone else and the term "Figgers" enters into use. Despite the town leader's best attempts to make the family miserable, the Figurellis end up more or less becoming the most well-off members of Moralton until the episode's end.
 
He was voiced by Jay Johnston in the first two seasons and by David Herman in the third season.

Mrs. Figurelli
Mrs. Figurelli is Mr. Figurelli's wife. They have two children together, Billy and Susie. Mrs. Figurelli works as a cat cleaner (washing cats). It is revealed in "Maturity", that she and her husband get into bad fights and arguments sometimes, but nothing bothers her much. In "God's Image", she and her family were segregated in Moralton.

Billy Figurelli
Billy Figurelli  (born February 25, 1994) is the son of Sal and Mrs. Figurelli. He has a sister named Susie. He is close friends with Orel. In the episode, "God's Image" after church, he hangs out with Orel, Doughy, Kid One, Tommy, and Joe. Joe throws a broken glass bottle at his hand and it then bleeds. Orel gives him a Caucasian bandaid (a band-aid only for white people) to heal the cut on his hand, but he took it off his hand because he was tan. Later, Billy and his family were segregated from the town.

Susie Figurelli
Susan "Susie" Figurelli is Billy's sister and the daughter of Sal and Mrs. Figurelli. In "God's Image", she and her family were segregated from the rest of the town.

Stephanie Foamwire-Putty
Stephanie Foamwire-Putty is the heavily pierced punk proprietor of Moralton's lone sex and piercings shop. Despite her outside appearance, she is quite a warm and caring person and one of the most rational people in Moralton. She once gave Orel a Prince Albert piercing and becomes friends with him, even agreeing to hear his weekly pleas for her to go to church.  Later, when Orel was having trouble relaxing, she gave him some incense and a record of Buddhist chants so that he could meditate, which succeeded in helping him.  It is revealed in "Be Fruitful and Multiply" that her mother, a crazed spinster named Gladys Foamwire (who was known for her extreme religiosity in even so religious a town as Moralton) stole Reverend Putty's heart-shaped wastebasket, that was filled with tissue papers that he used to clean himself after masturbating, and used his sperm that was in the tissue to impregnate herself. The rest of her childhood is described by Stephanie as "uninteresting," though her heart was broken when she was in high school; her first love, (the mother of Orel's friend, Doughy) Kim, turned out to be using her in order to get the attention of her future husband, Karl. After reuniting with her father, they have since maintained a healthy father-daughter relationship, one of the few, if not the only such relationship shown to actually work.

Stephanie is voiced by Britta Phillips.

Officer Roger Papermouth
Roger Papermouth is one of Moralton's police officers. Very devout, he lists God and Jesus as his partners as he goes out to fight crime and takes time to lecture kids on the dangers of Halloween—of becoming devil worshipers. He is never seen without a smile on his face and a gun in his hand. In the Halloween episode, he horrifies them at the possibility of them becoming Buddhists, yet cheers them up by explaining that Jesus guides his bullets into the brains or lungs of criminals, followed by cheerfully waving around his gun and shouting "Pow, pow, pow!" In private it is revealed that Papermouth is quite wealthy, but also lonely, due to his wife Florence leaving him because of the cowardice he showed when Orel resurrected the dead and fellow police officer, Officer O'Chunky, was killed by Doughy's recently resurrected grandfather. In the episode "Sacrifice," Clay tries to goad him, Dr. Potterswheel, and Reverend Putty into punching him in the face, but the three of them leave in disgust instead.

He was voiced by Jay Johnston, and also by David Herman in some season three episodes.

Mr. Creepler
Cecil Creepler was the town's ice cream man. Very soft-spoken, he can be found roving about the town in his ice cream truck at all hours of the day or night, selling a variety of Bible-themed frozen treats. In Courtship it is revealed that he is a pedophile with a fixation for Doughy, whom he attempts to lure into the back of his truck with promises of ice cream and other gifts.  In Alone, it was revealed that he was a serial rapist who recently died in a Moralton jail and that he raped and impregnated Miss Sculptham with her unborn twins.
His last name is a reference to his pedophilia. He is voiced by Dino Stamatopoulos.

Millie Fakey (née Spraybooth)
Millie Fakey is Principal Fakey's wife. Her first appearance was in the episode "Repression" when Principal Fakey comes home from work and she tries to make him spend time with her, but he pays no attention to her. She is always neglected by him and wish he could spend time with him. Millie is unaware that her husband is having an affair with Nurse Bendy. It is revealed in the episode "Help", that she was one of Bloberta's engaged friends, and married Principal Fakey at the assuming age of 18. She used to be friends with Bloberta, and she was a frequent protester with Ms. Censordoll, but she doesn't do that anymore.

The Christeins
The town's only Jews for Jesus members are the Christeins. They are a stereotypical Jewish family in all but religion—complete with nasal New York accents and a warped combination of religions. They show their new-found faith by wearing kippahs with crosses on them, mix in Yiddish expressions with praise for Christ, have menorahs separated in half (later revealed to be a key unlocking a secret passage to the attic) and offer up a variety of non-kosher treats and Jesus-shaped matzah. Despite their conversion to Christianity, the Christeins are treated with scorn by the townfolk—the family can be observed shifting uncomfortably when Putty warns threateningly that the local church could have been a synagogue if there was no Jesus and Mr. Figurelli once declares, "lousy Jew...for Jesus!" The family members explored are Junior Christein II, a boy who is in Orel's grade and is an exceptionally talented singer. His Uncle Bernie, who is an influential figure on Broadway. Sharon Christein is the mother of Junior Christein II and Christein Daughter. She speaks a stereotypical Jewish accent, and is a fair cook. In the episode "God's Chef", she was impregnated by Orel when she was asleep. She could've gave her unborn child up for adoption. Christein Daughter is Junior Christein II's little sister. She is called 'Christein Daughter' because her real name was never revealed on the show. She enjoys playing games like dreidel with her brother. Junior Christein Sr. is the father of the two children and is Sharon's husband. He speaks a stereotypical Jewish accent like his wife. It could be that he regrets the family's conversion to Christianity, as in one episode, he was saying how he regretted flushing his money down the toilet.  Mr. and Mrs. Christein are voiced by Scott Adsit and Britta Phillips.

Link McMissons
Link McMissons is a once-frozen prehistoric caveman found during a forest scout trip who Orel quickly befriends. However, the caveman violently wrecks a church bake sale with the only possible solution being to educate him with God and Moralton-style Christian values. He later becomes a popular conservative radio talk show host.  He derides anti-fundamentalist Protestant theories and facts such as the existence of dinosaurs and evolution, yet during an interview he is confronted with his own odd past and reverts to his primal instincts. Causing general havoc for the town, he is cornered and put into a freezer where he is forgotten and becomes frozen yet again. In the future, he will apparently be found by a young boy named Zorel, who bears a striking resemblance to Orel. He is voiced by Scott Adsit.

Ms. Florence Papermouth
Florence Papermouth is a minor character in the series, and has only been seen on a few occasions.  In "Sundays", an episode in which she takes a major part, it is revealed that she was married to Officer Papermouth and has a daughter named Anne. She grew tired of Roger's cowardice and left him. She seems to have an eating disorder stemming from constantly diminishing self-esteem.  She is seen in church sitting next to her attractive roommate, Dottie (who seems happy with her own appearance and actively puts Florence down, which would lead to her attempting to dull the pain by eating.) In one episode, she was seen being brought to tears by protesters who booed her and postulated that God hated her because she was fat. She is fixated on Reverend Putty and finally enjoys relations with him only to suffer humiliation when Putty cries out Dottie's name in climax.
She is voiced by Britta Phillips.

Anne Papermouth
Annebelle "Anne" Papermouth is the daughter of Florence and Roger Papermouth. In church, she sits next to her mother. When she sees her father, she says "look mommy it's daddy!" in excitement to him. In "Sundays" she is at the "All You Can Eatery" diner with her mother, her mother's friend, Dottie, and Dottie's adopted daughter, Tina. She is good friends with Tina. Dottie sends the two girls outside to play while a zombie riot was happening. Anne had a teddy bear that she took with her to church, but it was destroyed by her father when he realized Florence was having an affair with another man (unaware of Reverend Putty).

Dottie Trophywife
Deloris "Dottie" Trophywife  is a minor character of the show. She has blonde hair and wears a magenta outfit similar to Jacqueline Kennedy on 23 November 1963. She seems to be more of a vain person. In "Love", she spanks her adopted daughter, Tina, when she tells her she misses her father. Her major appearance was in "Sundays", when she and Tina was at the "All You Can Eatery" diner with her roommate Florence and her daughter Anne. She sends Tina and Anne to play outside when a zombie riot was happening. In church, she sits next to Florence. Dottie seems to be happy with herself and actively puts Florence down. She knows that Florence has a crush a Reverend Putty, so when Florence invites him to her apartment, Dottie wears lingerie to seduce him. Florence takes him to her bedroom and they have a one-night stand. He yells out Dottie's name in climax and they immediately stop. The next day in church, Dottie is frowning and feels bad for what she did last night. In "Sacrifice", Reverend Putty ends his relationship with Florence which causes her to cry. She is voiced by K. K. Dodds.

Dolly Forghetti
Dolly Forghetti is the bartender at the bar pub Forghetty's. She is a minor character, and is seen in the episodes "Sundays" and "Sacrifice", where Clay and Daniel are often seen. Dolly warmly mentions to Clay in "Sacrifice" that she missed him while he and Orel were on the trip, (possibly only because of all the business she attains from his drinking) to which Clay shrugs off. She also apparently chooses to turn a blind eye to his homoerotic interactions with Stopframe whenever the two are there together. Her character is upbeat and positive despite the growing argument between Clay, Putty, Papermouth, and Potterswheel. She eventually becomes so frustrated with Clay's inappropriate comments concerning women that she breaks a glass and storms out of her own bar. She is voiced by Carolyn Lawrence.

Mr. Nohammers 
Don Nohammers is the owner of Nohammer's Hardware.  Despite his name, his store sells hammers.  He is very noticeably jittery, twitching constantly.  He dreads receiving phone calls, as he constantly gets calls asking about whether his shops carries hammers.  Because of this, his shop is completely covered with hammers and signs declaring "We have hammers!"

He is voiced by Dino Stamatopoulos.

The Latchkeys 
Karl and Kimberly 'Kim' Latchkey are Doughy's parents. They have been together since high school and continue to behave like teenagers long after graduating. Karl is a stereotypical jock who makes lewd and immature jokes, while Kim is a vapid individual who cares about nothing more than her and Karl's amusement. In the past, she was close friends with Stephanie, who believed that Kim had feelings for her. Kim did not know this. When the "Arms Length" dance came around, Kim only kissed Stephanie as a joke and to freak out Reverend Putty. When Stephanie tried to explain her feelings to Kim, the latter shrugged it off as a "sense of humor".  As a result of their immaturity, they severely neglect Doughy, either giving him money to leave the house or forgetting to let him in so that they can have sex. They're so oblivious to their son's existence that Karl once threatens to beat Doughy up after finding him alone with Kim, thinking Doughy was trying to steal her.

Karl and Kim are voiced by Jay Johnston and KK Dodds.

The Posabules 
The Posabules are a family who are, in almost every respect, identical to the Puppingtons, with the exception of slight differences with hair, clothes, and voices. The most prominent member of this family, Christina Posabule, is essentially a female counterpart of Orel. They have the same personality, and they fall in love over this. Block is also a member of this family and is Shapey's counterpart. When the Posabules moved to Moralton in the Season Two episode, The Lord's Prayer, Clay and Bloberta initially got along very well with their counterparts Art and Poppet, respectively, until they learned they were "the wrong type of Protestants" (the Posabules advocated "forgiving debt" while the Puppingtons advocated "forgiving trespassing" in differing versions of The Lord's Prayer), and have since developed a mutual grudge against one other. Orel and Christina's feelings for each other, however, remained completely unchanged and despite their parents refusing to let them see one other, they would rebelliously sneak out at night to meet. The Posabules moved away at the end of the episode, accidentally switching Shapey and Block, though only Orel and Christina noticed at first. Since then, they crossed paths with the Puppingtons twice more in Season Three: once by Orel in Closeface as an excuse to see Christina (only to be abruptly turned away by her still-embittered father), and again by Bloberta in Numb to actually retrieve Shapey though Block was rejected when he showed love for Bloberta. At the end of Closeface, Orel and Christina secretly went to the Arm's Length Dance with each other, where they are the only ones that are enjoying the dance. In the series finale Honor, an adult Christina is shown to be happily married to Orel, though it is unknown if both of their parents have made peace.

Art is voiced by Scott Adsit, Poppet by Britta Phillips, Christina by Carolyn Lawrence, and Block by Tigger Stamatopoulos.

Mr. Cartsen 
Mr. Cartsen is Orel's pious scout counselor. He teaches his scout students about how to survive in the wilderness. He is the same age as the bartender, Dolly. In the episode "Waste" he teaches them about how drinking urine is a good way to survive on the wilderness. In "Geniusis" he tells the story about the Missing Link.

Clicky
Clicky is the school janitor. In the episode, "God's Chef" he finds Orel masturbating in the bathroom, and he is sent to Principal Fakey's office. Later, Orel learns where do babies come from by his father, Clay. This led Orel to impregnate a lot of women with a pastry bag filled with his own sperm.

Gladys Foamwire
Gladys Foamwire was Stephanie's mother. The story flashback about how Gladys conceived Stephanie  was told in the episode, "Be Fruitful and Multiply": In 1975, Gladys stole Reverend Putty's heart-shaped waste basket that was filled tissue papers that had sperm samples inside of them. Later, she impregnated herself with the sperm sample, and 9 months later she gave birth to her daughter, Stephanie. It was revealed that Stephanie is Reverend Putty's daughter, and the two bond a good family relationship like no other in Moralton, Nurse Bendy and Joe being one of the only exceptions.

Mr. and Mrs. Jointson
Mr. and Mrs. Jointson are minor characters, and are an elderly couple. In the episode, "Maturity", Orel and Doughy observed how they reacted to each other, and seemed like they were talking to each other depressingly without eye contact.

Farmer Phoneycrops
Farmer Phoneycrops is the town farmer. In the episode "Offensiveness", Orel comes to his farm to get chicken eggs for Ms. Censordoll. When Phoneycrops shows Orel the chicken coop, he is revealed to have a sexual attraction to his hens, especially when they lay eggs. In the lost episode "Abstinence", he teaches Doughy how to be a "cock-blocker" in order to prevent the male chickens from mating with the hens.

Flygron
Flygron claims to be a "satanist". In the episode "Satan", he invites Coach Stopframe to his "Satanic" ritual party, but is shocked when he brings Orel with him as "the ritual virgin", asking if Stopframe knows any LEGAL virgins. The party isn't what Coach Stopframe was expecting, and Flygron and the other "satanists" are not what they claim to be. Instead, they are nerdy, annoying, overweight hedonists who eat junk food, get naked and have kinky sex with each other.

Ms. Gray
Ms. Gray is an elderly woman and one of the minor characters of the series. She is mostly seen taking her two grandchildren to the movie theater.

Lily and Leaf
Lily and Leaf were a part of the Christian folk band called the Crucifolks. They are the same age as Clay Puppington and Ms. Censordoll. Lily used to play the tambourine, Leaf used to play the banjo, and Dale played the stand-up bass. In "School Pageant" the band separated, because Lily and Leaf both got married and left Dale to be a drama teacher.

Dr. Chosenberg
Dr. Chosenberg is a Jewish doctor from the town of Otherton. He is the same age as Principal Fakey (50 years old). His only appearance was in "Holy Visage" when he sits next to Orel on the bus. He gets wounded in the stomach by Orel's Jesus Wiggleneck toy. Chosenberg wakes up with a bunch of people around him in celebration of the unbandaged and uncured Jesus-shaped wound on his stomach. Many uncured patients pray at the wound while he suffered. He finally cures the wound by himself when Orel sets his Jesus Wiggleneck toy on a table with medicine on it.

Tina Trophywife & Tina Noheart
Tina Trophywife and Tina Noheart are identical twin sisters. Their parents separated them at birth, keeping Tina Noheart and giving up Tina Trophywife for adoption, and she was adopted by Dottie Trophywife. They both look alike but have different personalities. Tina Noheart first appeared in "The Lord's Greatest Gift" when she's in the library to tattle to Ms. Censordoll. She is a mischievous little girl. her surname "Noheart" is possibly a reference to her and her parents being evil. Tina Trophywife is a sweet and good-natured little girl. She first appeared in the episode "Love", when she is spanked by Dottie when she tells her that she misses her father. Her parents are recently divorced. In the episode "Sundays", she is at the "All You Can Eatery" diner with Dottie, Florence and Anne. She is good friends with Anne. While her Dottie is talking to Florence, she raises her hand to try to speak to her, but she doesn't respond. She sends Tina and Anne to play outside while there was a zombie riot happening.

Mr. and Mrs. Littler
Mr. and Mrs. Littler are Tommy's parents. Mr. Littler has blond hair while Mrs. Littler has brown hair. They both concern about Tommy's education and learning development. In the episode "God's Blunders", they are seen having a meeting with Principal Fakey in his office, talking about Tommy's education and how poorly his grade is on the science test. Principal Fakey tells them that their son will be placed in a Special Education classroom, and it made them upset to hear about it. The next morning, Mrs. Littler is seen in the kitchen mixing Tommy's food into liquid and putting it in a bag to take with him for lunch. On the kitchen bookshelves in the background, there can be cookbooks with threatening titles on them. This could be why Mrs. Littler spends most of her time in the kitchen.

Mr. and Mrs. Littler also have an unnamed daughter, who is also Tommy's sister, but was never seen on the show. She was first mentioned by Tommy in the episode "God Fearing", when he said he was going to scare her on Halloween.

Moral Orel
Moral Orel